Jordan Anthony Poole (born June 19, 1999) is an American professional basketball player for the Golden State Warriors of the National Basketball Association (NBA). He attended Rufus King High School in Milwaukee and La Lumiere School in La Porte, Indiana. He was a 2016 first team All-Wisconsin selection as a junior and a member of the 2017 Dick's National High School Championship winner as a senior. Poole then played college basketball for the Michigan Wolverines. At Michigan, he was a member of the 2017–18 team that won the 2018 Big Ten tournament and advanced to that season's national championship game. 

Nicknamed "Poole Party", Poole spent two seasons as a two-way player of the Warriors organization before becoming an integral part of the NBA team’s rotation starting in 2021. He led the NBA in free throw percentage for the 2021–22 NBA season and went on to win an NBA championship with the Warriors the same season.

High school career 
As a freshman at Rufus King High School in Wisconsin, Poole once made a game-tying three-point shot in the closing seconds after coming off the bench. Poole visited Illinois, Wisconsin, Indiana, Drake and Marquette as a blue chip high school basketball recruit. Then, he visited Michigan for the September 26 football game between the 2015 Wolverines and BYU, receiving an offer that weekend. He returned to campus on October 17 for the rivalry game against Michigan State. On October 23, 2015, four-star recruit Poole became the first commitment for the Class of 2017 after a home gym visit from head coach John Beilein and assistant coach LaVall Jordan and multiple Michigan campus visits. Poole had several competing offers including Illinois, Indiana, Nebraska, Memphis, Marquette, Virginia Tech and Auburn. At the time of his commitment, he was the 2nd-ranked overall prospect and the 1st-ranked shooting guard in the national class of 2017. As a junior, Poole was a 2016 WBCA All-State Boys Basketball first team selection.

On July 1, 2016, Poole announced that he would transfer from Rufus King to La Lumiere School in Indiana for his senior year, where he would experience a campus lifestyle, play a schedule with several ESPN broadcasts, and be teamed up with then-unsigned class of 2017 prospects Brian Bowen and Jeremiah Tilmon. By the time Poole signed his National Letter of Intent to play college basketball for Michigan as part of a three-scholarship player incoming class with Isaiah Livers and Eli Brooks on November 11, 2016, he was the 90th ranked overall prospect. Poole was a member of the 2017 Dick's National High School Champion La Lumiere team. In the Dick's National Championship game, Poole posted 13 points, 3 steals, 3 rebounds and 4 assists, and shot 3–7 on his three-point shots. The 13 points included a shot clock buzzer beater in the closing seconds of the third quarter. La Lumiere, which included 2017 McDonald's All-Americans Bowen and Jaren Jackson Jr., defeated perennial power Montverde Academy, who was led by Canadian sophomore R. J. Barrett. La Lumiere had lost the 2016 Dick National Championship game prior to Poole's arrival.

College career

Freshman season

On December 2, Michigan defeated Indiana 69–55 in its 2017–18 Big Ten conference season opener with Poole leading the way with a team- and then career-high 19 points in his Big Ten debut. On January 15, Michigan defeated Maryland 68–67. After trailing by 14 points in the first half and 10 points at halftime, Michigan was trailing by 7 points in the second half when they made 7 consecutive three-point shots, including three by Poole whose 11 points made him one of only two double digit scorers for Michigan in the game. For the February 3 contest against Minnesota, the Maize Rage (Michigan's student section) held a "Poole party" in the stands, but Poole missed all four of his field goal attempts. Poole finished the regular season with three straight double digit scoring efforts, making 9 of 12 three-point shots against (#8 AP Poll/#9 Coaches Poll) Ohio State on February 18, Penn State on February 21, and Maryland on February 24. On March 4, a victory over (#8 AP Poll/#8 Coaches Poll) Purdue gave Michigan its second consecutive Big Ten tournament championship, even though Poole slumped during the 4-game run, missing all 9 of his three-point shots.

On March 17, 2018, Michigan defeated (#21 AP Poll/#19 Coaches Poll) Houston 64–63 in the second round of the 2018 NCAA tournament, following a game-winning buzzer beater three-point shot by Poole, giving Michigan its fourth Sweet 16 in six years. The shot was described as nearly identical to the buzzer beater he had made a year earlier in the Dick's National Championship game.

Sophomore season

On November 17, 2018, Poole's career-high 22 points helped Michigan defeat George Washington 84–61. On November 28, Michigan defeated (#11/#13) North Carolina 84–67 in the ACC–Big Ten Challenge, as Poole contributed 18 points, including 5-for-8 three point shooting. On December 1, Michigan defeated (#19/#18) Purdue 76–57 in its Big Ten Conference season opener. Michigan was led by Poole with a game-high 21 points, including 5-for-5 from three-point range. On December 3, Poole was recognized as Big Ten Player of the Week for his performance against these two ranked teams. On December 8, Michigan defeated South Carolina 89–78. Michigan was led by Poole with a career-high 26 points. On December 30, Michigan defeated Binghamton 74–52. Poole posted 18 points, including a career-high six three-pointers. On January 13, the 2018–19 Wolverines team defeated Northwestern to establish a school record for best start at 17–0 and tied the school's record 17-game win streak. Following the season, he was a 2019 All-Big Ten honorable mention selection (coaches and media). On March 23, Michigan defeated Florida 64–49 in the second round of the 2019 NCAA Division I men's basketball tournament. Michigan was led by Poole with a game-high 19 points earning its third consecutive the Sweet 16 appearance and second consecutive one keyed by Poole. Following the season, on April 9, 2019, Poole (along with teammates Iggy Brazdeikis and Charles Matthews) declared for the 2019 NBA draft with the intention of hiring agents.

Professional career

Golden State Warriors (2019–present)

Early years (2019–2021) 
On June 20, 2019, Poole was drafted 28th overall in the first round of the 2019 NBA draft by the Golden State Warriors. His guaranteed contract was $6.2 million over three years. On July 11, the Warriors signed Poole to his rookie scale contract.  In the Warriors opening game of the 2019–20 season on October 24, Poole made his NBA debut, coming off the bench in a 122–141 loss to the Los Angeles Clippers with five points, two rebounds, two assists and a steal. On October 29, he made his first NBA start for the Warriors against the Pelicans scoring 13 points in the Warriors first win of the season. In December 2019, Poole was assigned to the Santa Cruz Warriors of the NBA G-League. In his first game there, he scored 23 points against the Stockton Kings. In his second game, he made five three pointers in a loss against the Texas Legends, scoring 31 points and posting five rebounds, four assists and three steals. In January, 2020 Poole returned to the Golden State Warriors lineup. On January 18 Poole scored a then career-high 21 points in a 109–95 win against the Orlando Magic.

Starting shooting guard Klay Thompson would miss the entire season for the 2020–21 Warriors. On March 4, 2021, Poole set a then career-high 26 points in a 120–98 loss to the Phoenix Suns. On May 14, Poole posted a then career-high 38 points in a 125–122 win over the New Orleans Pelicans. The Warriors used several shooting guards during the season and closed the 2020–21 NBA season with Kent Bazemore, Mychal Mulder, Damion Lee, and Kelly Oubre Jr. all in the picture.

Breakout season and first championship (2021–present) 
Poole beat out Otto Porter Jr. and Lee for the 2021–22 Warriors' starting shooting guard spot, while Thompson continued to recover. On November 21, 2021, Poole scored 33 points on a career-high 8 three-pointers made in a 119–104 win over the Toronto Raptors. With the return of Klay Thompson from injury to the starting line-up in January 2022 Poole began to play point guard in a three-guard system, alongside both Thompson and Steph Curry. With Curry sidelined late in the season, Poole scored 20 or more points in 18 of the final 20 games. 17 of those 20+ performances came in consecutive games. The 17-game 20+-point streak ended on April 7 against the Los Angeles Lakers on a night where Poole scored 19 points and set a career-high with 11 assists to contribute to a 128–112 victory. Poole (92.5%) edged out Curry (92.3%) as the NBA annual free throw percentage leader. It was the first time in 45 years that teammates finished in the top two positions. On the final day he went 4-for-4 to hold on to the lead, ending the season with 28 consecutive free throws made. Poole was not one of the three official finalists (Ja Morant, Darius Garland, and Dejounte Murray) for the NBA Most Improved Player Award, and finished fourth in the balloting (although he finished third in first place votes). On April 16, in Game 1 of the first round of the 2022 NBA playoffs, he started and scored 30 points in a 123–107 win over the Denver Nuggets. The game was Poole's first career postseason appearance. Two days later, in Game 2, he posted 29 points and eight assists in a 126–106 win. The Warriors would go on and win the NBA Finals against the Boston Celtics, awarding Poole his first NBA championship.

On October 5, 2022, during a team practice with the Warriors, Poole and teammate Draymond Green got into an altercation resulting in Green striking Poole. On October 9, Green publicly apologized for the incident and announced that he would spend a few days away from the team. On October 12, the NBA fined Green for the altercation as opposed to the suspected suspension. On October 15, 2022, Poole signed a four-year contract extension worth $123 million and 17M in incentives with 5M categorized as LTBE with the Warriors. On November 14, Poole scored 36 points on 13-of-20 shooting from the field in a 132–95 win over the San Antonio Spurs. On December 18, Poole scored a career-high 43 points in a 126–110 win over the Toronto Raptors. On December 30, Poole scored 41 points, along with five rebounds and six assists in a 118–112 win over the Portland Trail Blazers.

On January 25, 2023, Poole put up a game-winning lay-up in a 122–120 win over the Memphis Grizzlies. On February 6, Poole put up 21 points alongside a career-high 12 assists in a 141–114 win over the Oklahoma City Thunder.

Player profile
Although criticized when entering the league for his lack of polish, Poole has developed into a dynamic and efficient scorer throughout his tenure with the Warriors.  In addition to his shooting ability, Poole is a prolific finisher at the rim, frequently slashing to the basket using his ball-handling skills and speed while being a proficient mid-range shot creator. Poole's improvement in his all-around game has led to him becoming a capable passer, averaging a career-high 4.0 assists per game during his third season in a combo guard role. His combination of abilities has drawn comparisons to Warriors teammate Stephen Curry, with some basketball media writers calling him the "third Splash Brother".

Career statistics

NBA

Regular season

|-
| style="text-align:left;"|
| style="text-align:left;"|Golden State
| 57 || 14|| 22.4 || .333 || .279 || .798 || 2.1 || 2.4|| .6 || .2 || 8.8
|-
| style="text-align:left;"|
| style="text-align:left;"|Golden State
| 51 || 7 || 19.4 || .432 || .351 || .882 || 1.8 || 1.9 || .5 || .2 || 12.0
|- 
| style="text-align:left;background:#afe6ba;"|†
| style="text-align:left;"|Golden State 
| 76 || 51 || 30.0 || .448 || .364 || bgcolor="CFECEC" | .925* || 3.4 || 4.0 || .8 || .3 || 18.5
|- class="sortbottom"
| style="text-align:center;" colspan="2"|Career
| 184 || 72 || 24.7 || .416 || .341 || .885 || 2.6 || 2.9 || .7 || .2 || 13.7

Playoffs

|-
| style="text-align:left;background:#afe6ba;"|2022†
| style="text-align:left;"| Golden State
| 22 || 5 || 27.5 || .508 || .391 || .915 || 2.8 || 3.8 || .8 || .4 || 17.0
|- class="sortbottom"
| style="text-align:center;" colspan="2"| Career
| 22 || 5 || 27.5 || .508 || .391 || .915 || 2.8 || 3.8 || .8 || .4 || 17.0

College

|-
| style="text-align:left;"|2017–18
| style="text-align:left;"|Michigan
| 38 || 0 || 12.5 || .429 || .370 || .827 || 1.4 || .6 || .5 || .2 || 6.1
|-
| style="text-align:left;"|2018–19
| style="text-align:left;"|Michigan
| 37 || 37 || 33.1 || .436 || .369 || .833 || 3.0 || 2.2 || 1.1 || .2 || 12.1
|- class="sortbottom"
| style="text-align:center;" colspan="2"|Career
| 75 || 37 || 22.7 || .434 || .370 || .831 || 2.2 || 1.4 || .8 || .2 || 9.4

Personal life
Poole is the son of Monet and Anthony Poole. Poole has an older sister who attended Marquette. He also has a younger sister.

See also
List of National Basketball Association annual free throw percentage leaders

References

External links

 Michigan Wolverines bio
 College stats at ESPN
 College stats at CBS Sports

1999 births
Living people
American men's basketball players
Basketball players from Milwaukee
Golden State Warriors draft picks
Golden State Warriors players
La Lumiere School alumni
Michigan Wolverines men's basketball players
Rufus King International High School alumni
Santa Cruz Warriors players
Shooting guards